Xalitla is a genus of beetles in the family Cerambycidae, containing the following species:

 Xalitla azteca Lane, 1959
 Xalitla genuina Martins, 1970
Xalitla limoni Santos-Silva & Skillman, 2020
 Xalitla punctatissima Martins, 1970

References

Ibidionini